The 2013 East Coast Bullbars Australian Rally Championship is the 46th season of the Australian Rally Championship, one of the world's oldest continuously run rally championships. The season began 1 March at the newly revived National Capital Rally, and is scheduled to end 16 November at Rally Victoria, after six events.

The championship incorporates two international events, Round 5 is a World Rally Championship event, Rally Australia, while Round 4, the International Rally of Queensland is a round of the Asia-Pacific Rally Championship.

Each domestic rally is contested over two heats, with three or four components to the two international events.

With the championship now awarded specifically to two-wheel-drive cars exclusively has seen an influx of European and Asian Super 2000 and Super 1600 cars as well as a revival of older rear-wheel-drive performance cars. While most of the top drivers have moved out of the Mitsubishi Lancer and Subaru Impreza 4WD turbos, they remain competitive with reigning Western Australian rally champion Alex Stone winning a heat at the Forest Rally.

Between Honda Jazz driver Eli Evans and Renault Clio driver Scott Peddar have dominated the 2013 season, winning all bar one heat and taking eleven of the 18 top three positions. Evans leads the championship by 29 points over Peddar. Peddar's teammate Tom Wilde is 88 points behind Evans in third. Mazda 2 driver Brendan Reeves, who is also racing in the NACAM Rally Championship is fourth a distant 119 points from Peddar. Proving the flexibility of the new regulations, Jack Monkhouse is fifth in the championship driving a 1999 model Nissan Silvia.

Race calendar and results

The 2013 Australian Rally Championship is as follows:

Championship standings
The 2013 Australian Rally Championship points are as follows:

Australian Championship

Four wheel drive class

References

External links
Official website

2013
Australian
Rally Championship